is a village located in Okhotsk Subprefecture, Hokkaido, Japan.

As of September 2016, the village has an estimated population of 1,120. The total area is 308.12 km2.

Geography

Climate

Mascot

He is an orange and white bull who is a musician. He works at the local dairy farm. He carries his electric guitar to play (though he sometimes uses it as a weapon).

Notable people from Nishiokoppe
Hagurohana Toji, former sumo wrestler

References

External links

Official Website 

Villages in Hokkaido